il Fatto Quotidiano (English: "The Daily Fact") is an Italian daily newspaper owned by Editoriale Il Fatto SpA published in Rome, Italy. It was founded on 23 September 2009 and was edited by Antonio Padellaro until 2015, when Marco Travaglio became the editor.

According to several observers commenting articles (including the paper's co-founder Michele Santoro and former contributor Luca Telese), the paper is politically close to the Five Star Movement. The newspaper anyway, has also been critic of the Five Star Movement.

According to other observers commenting articles, the newspaper is Left-wing.

According to other observers commenting articles, the newspaper is Right-wing.

As per property status-quo and reputation, the newspaper results to be free independent press.

History
Late within 2008, Marco Travaglio was asked by fellow journalist Massimo Fini to advertise the latter's newly founded magazine, La Voce del Ribelle ("The Rebel's Voice"), on the former's blog, voglioscendere.it, with the objective of gathering "a few hundred subscriptions". Thousands of people answered, allowing Fini's magazine to succeed. Because of this success, Travaglio started considering the idea of using his blog to launch a new newspaper, independent from public funding.

The intention of publishing a new national newspaper was announced by Marco Travaglio on his blog, voglioscendere.it on 1 June 2009. The title il Fatto Quotidiano ("The Daily Fact") was chosen as a homage to journalist Enzo Biagi, who was purged from state television RAI at prime minister Silvio Berlusconi's request, and whose hugely successful daily ten-minute prime-time news commentary on Rai Uno, named Il Fatto, was removed from programming. The newspaper could not just be named "Il Fatto" because RAI, the Italian public broadcast vetoed it mentioning name ownership, even if its very management was the one who put it off the air.

In June 2009, l'Antefatto, a promotional website, was set up containing information about subscription and the development of the project.

The publisher stated he would not use the Italian state advertising and funding to run the newspaper but instead he would use only money from sales and market advertisements.

The first issue, printed in 100,000 copies in addition to 32,000 subscriptions, was already sold out before 8:00 AM on 23 September, even though distribution was limited to the largest cities. As a consequence, the newspaper announced it would immediately double the number of copies and publish the first issue, free of charge, on the Internet.

It is considered close to the Five Star Movement (M5S). The pro-M5S line of the paper has caused internal clashes in the editorial staff and contributed to the resignation of several journalists, including Luca Telese, Michele Santoro, Davide Vecchi,<ref>{{Cite web |date=2018-11-04 |title=Gli Angelucci strappano Davide Vecchi al Fatto Quotidiano e lo mettono a dirigere i Corrierini |url=http://www.dagospia.com/rubrica-2/media_e_tv/angelucci-strappano-davide-vecchi-39-39-fatto-187076.htm |access-date= |website=Dagospia}}</ref> and Stefano Feltri.

Following the start of the 2022 Russian invasion of Ukraine, journalist and co-founder Furio Colombo said the paper had taken a pro-Russian stance. He was also critical of the theories of fellow columnist  on the German occupation of Italy during WW2. Its reporting on the war has been seen as so pro-Russia and pro-Putin that the Russian embassy has praised and retweet it.

 Ownership il Fatto Quotidiano is published by Editoriale Il Fatto S.p.A., an Italian company. The company regulation states that up to 70% of the shares can be owned by entrepreneurs, but no one of them can own more than 16% of the share capital, estimated in 600,000 euros. The remaining 30% of the shares is owned by the newspaper columnists. Therefore, no important choice can be made without the consent of the columnists as a 70% majority + 1 is needed to carry out decisions about the newspaper policy or editor election. The managing director is Giorgio Poidomani.

Format and circulationil Fatto Quotidiano is printed in the compact format and full colour. It is distributed in Italy by post and through over 25,000 newsagents in the major Italian towns and regions. A significant fraction of the readership, about one fifth, is made out of subscriptions to the PDF version of the newspaper.

The circulation of il Fatto Quotidiano'' was 113,000 copies on 25 December 2009. The paper had a circulation of 78,669 copies in 2010.

Editors 
 Antonio Padellaro (2009–2015)
  Marco Travaglio (2015–present)

Columnists

References

External links
  

2009 establishments in Italy
Italian-language newspapers
Newspapers published in Rome
Newspapers established in 2009
Daily newspapers published in Italy
Italian news websites